"Lovin' You Against My Will" is a song written by Jamie O'Hara and recorded by American country music artist Gary Allan. It was released in April 2000 as the second single from Allan's 1999 album Smoke Rings in the Dark.  The song reached number 34 on the U.S. Billboard Hot Country Singles & Tracks chart.

Content
The song is about a man's emotions and lack of willpower when dealing with infidelity.

Critical reception
An uncredited review in Billboard was favorable, praising the electric guitar and a string section, while comparing the song's sound to a mix of Johnny Rivers and Bruce Springsteen.

Chart performance

References

2000 singles
Gary Allan songs
1999 songs
Songs written by Jamie O'Hara (singer)
Song recordings produced by Tony Brown (record producer)
Song recordings produced by Byron Hill
Song recordings produced by Mark Wright (record producer)
MCA Nashville Records singles
Songs about infidelity